John Storie Yeomans (15 May 1916 – 9 June 1995) was an Australian journalist and writer.

Career
During the 1960s and later, he wrote a range of books about Australia, Sydney and Sydney Opera House.

His most well-known book was written about his trip around Australia, The Scarce Australians, published by Penguin in 1969. The book was based on a journey undertaken between May and September 1965. The dust-jacket of the Penguin edition of The Scarce Australians summarizes the authors life and journalistic career thus:

 Born and educated in Sydney...AIF field artillery subaltern in WWII... sub-editor in Fleet Street ...copy-editor in Canada ...staff correspondent for Australian papers in New York and London... sometime resident in Middle East and Papua 

In 1978 he was in an accident where he almost lost an arm.

Works

Notes

Writers from Sydney
1916 births
1995 deaths
20th-century Australian journalists